Rob, Bob, Bobby, Bobbie or Robert Richardson may refer to:

Entertainment industry professionals
Bob Richardson (animator) (born 1946), American Emmy Award winner
Bob Richardson (photographer) (1928–2005), American fashion artist and teacher
Robert Richardson (cinematographer) (born 1955), American Academy Award winner
Rob Richardson, American developer in 2014 of mobile app Pocket Points

Military men
Robert Richardson (British Army officer) (1929–2014), Lieutenant-General in Northern Ireland
Robert Richardson (RAAF officer) (born 1941), Australian Air Vice Marshal
Robert C. Richardson Jr. (1882–1954), American Army general during World Wars I and II
Robert C. Richardson III (1918–2011), American Army brigadier general, son of above
Robert V. Richardson (1820–1870), American Civil War Confederate general

Public officials
Robert Richardson (Labour politician) (1862–1943), British MP, 1918–1931
Robert Richardson (Lord Treasurer) (before 1512—1578), Scottish cleric and administrator
Robert A. Richardson (1827–1895), American jurist on Virginia Supreme Court of Appeals
Robert Carl Richardson (born 1956), American judge on Texas Court of Criminal Appeals, a/k/a Bert Richardson
Bobbie Richardson (born 1949), American politician from North Carolina

Sportsmen
Robert Richardson (alpine skier) (1927–2004), Canadian alpine skier
Robert Richardson (sitting volleyball) (born 1982), British Paralympian
Robert Richardson Jr. (racing driver) (born 1982), American NASCAR veteran
Bob Richardson (Canadian football) (born 1948), slotback
Bob Richardson (defensive back) (born 1944), American and Canadian football player
Bobby Richardson (born 1935), American baseball second baseman
Bobby Richardson (American football) (born 1992), defensive end

Writers
Robert Richardson (poet) (1850–1901), Australian journalist and children's author
Robert Richardson (religion) (1806–1876), American physician, academic and magazine editor
Robert Richardson (travel writer) (1779–1847), Scottish physician and author of travel literature
Robert Coleman Richardson (1937–2013), American physicist and author, 1996 Nobel Prize recipient
Robert D. Richardson (1934–2020), American historian and biographer
Robert Lorne Richardson (1860–1921), Canadian journalist and politician
Robert S. Richardson (1902–1981), American astronomer and science fiction writer, pen name Philip Latham
Robert W. Richardson (1910–2007), American railroad historian and editor
Bob Richardson (singer) (1903–1979), American writer of popular songs, birth name Dick Robertson
Rob Richardson, English academic author, Professor of Robotics at University of Leeds in 2020 (Star shaft)